Instant Coffee Baby is the seventh album by The Wave Pictures, their debut on Moshi Moshi Records.

Track listing
Songs written by David Tattersall except "Cassius Clay" by David Tattersall, David Ivar Herman Dune and Toby Goodshank.

 "Leave The Scene Behind"
 "I Love You Like A Madman"
 "We Come Alive"
 "Kiss Me"
 "Instant Coffee Baby"
 "Avocado Baby"
 "Friday Night In Loughborough"
 "Red Wine Teeth"
 "Strange Fruit For David"
 "Just Like A Drummer"
 "I Remembered"
 "January And December"
 "Cassius Clay"

Personnel
David Tattersall - Guitar, Ukulele, Piano, Handclaps, Cowbell, Bongos, Frog, Lead Vocals
Franic Rozycki - Bass Guitar, Farfisa Organ, Handclaps, Backing Vocals
Jonny Helm - Drums, Tambourine, Handclaps, Backing Vocals
Lisa Li Lund - Backing Vocals, Lead Vocals on "January And December"
Darren Hayman - Backing Vocals
Simon Trought - Handclaps, Backing Vocals
Mark Crown - Trumpet
Mathew Benson - Trombone
Aki Päivärinne - Saxophone
Dan Mayfield - Violin

References

2008 albums
The Wave Pictures albums